The Sallim Mattar Mosque is a mosque in Singapore serving the Muslim community in the Macpherson Estate. It organizes madrasahs on Sunday and the Friday Prayer. It is located along Mattar Road opposite Macpherson Primary School.

This mosque was originally built in 1960 by Shaikh Sallim Mattar, a Singaporean Arab. The mosque was reminiscent of village suraus in the 1960s. It has since been redeveloped to accommodate 1,400 people. It is situated within walking distance from Darul Ihsan, an orphanage. The mosque's main patrons are Muslims working around the Macpherson industrial estate as well as residents living nearby.

The mosque opens from 9:00 to 18:00.

Transportation
The mosque is accessible from Mattar MRT station.

See also
 Islam in Singapore
 List of mosques in Singapore

External links 
Masid Sallim Mattar on Majlis Ugama Islam Singapura

1960 establishments in Singapore
Mosques completed in 1960
Sallim Mattar
20th-century architecture in Singapore